ABC Wide World Of Sports Boxing is a boxing video game released in 1991. The player can create, train, and manage their own character. It is based on the American Broadcasting Company (ABC) program Wide World of Sports and was released at the time of the program's 30th anniversary. Sportscaster Dan Dierdorf, then a boxing commentator for ABC, is featured in this game.

In Europe the game was renamed TV Sports Boxing and published by Mindscape as part of Cinemaware's TV Sports series.

Reception
Computer Gaming World stated that the game's fighting animation was inferior to that of 4D Boxing but that its career options were superior.

See also

Evander Holyfield's Real Deal Boxing

References

External links

1991 video games
Wide World of Sports Boxing
Amiga games
Boxing video games
Cinemaware games
Data East video games
DOS games
Malibu Interactive games
Video games developed in the United States
Wide World of Sports (American TV series)
Mindscape games